Bill Boettger (born 1941) is a Canadian former international lawn and indoor bowler.

Biography 
Boettger was a schoolteacher by trade and also commentated for Canadian television during televised events.

He won a bronze medal in the pairs with Ronnie Jones and a silver medal in the fours at the 1992 World Outdoor Bowls Championship in Worthing.

He also won a silver medal with Jones in the pairs at the 1986 Commonwealth Games in Edinburgh.

He won five medals at the Asia Pacific Bowls Championships including three gold medals.

References

1941 births
Living people
Canadian male bowls players
Commonwealth Games medallists in lawn bowls
Sportspeople from Kitchener, Ontario
Commonwealth Games silver medallists for Canada
Bowls players at the 1986 Commonwealth Games
Medallists at the 1986 Commonwealth Games